The points classification in the Vuelta a España is a secondary classification in the Vuelta a España, in which the cyclists are ranked in a points classification based on the finish of each rider every stage.

History 
For the first time, a points classification was calculated in 1945, sponsored by Pirelli. It was calculated as follows:
The winner of a stage received 100 points, the second 99, and so on. If cyclists arrived in a group that was given the same time, they all received the same number of points.
The first five cyclists in a stage received 12 points for every minute that they arrived ahead of the number six of the stage.
For every point scored for the mountains classification, two points were given for this points classification.
On intermediate sprints, points could be won: 8 for the winner, 6 for the second, 4 and 2 for the next.

Although the sponsor said that the classification was a great success, it did not return the next edition.

The next time that a points classification was calculated, was in 1955. Then it used the method of adding the stage ranks, in the same way as the points classification in the Tour de France did then; just like in the Tour de France, the leader of the points classification (with the fewest points) wore a green jersey. In 1963, the points system changed such that from now on points were given to the first cyclists to reach the finish, and the cyclist with the most points was the leader.

Seán Kelly, Laurent Jalabert and Alejandro Valverde, with 4 titles each, share the record of victories.

System in use up to 2020

The Vuelta used to award an equal number of points on all stages for stage finishes. Except for time trials, stages also had one or more intermediate sprints offering points. This system paired with the high number of summit finishes at the Vuelta means there is a correlation between the overall classification and the points jersey. A good example from 2012, when sprinter John Degenkolb won five stages but only finished fourth in the points competition with Alejandro Valverde well ahead.

Current system
In 2021, the Vuelta switched to a system that awarded more points for finishes of flat stages. This is more in keeping with how the Tour de France and Giro d'Italia point classifications work.

All stages, other than time trial stages, have just one intermediate sprint.

Rules

Winners of the points classification by year

Multiple winners

References

Points classification
Cycling jerseys
Spanish sports trophies and awards